The Negrișoara is a left tributary of the river Plapcea in Romania. It flows into the Plapcea near Potcoava.

References

Rivers of Romania
Rivers of Olt County